Ruslan Kokaev (born 12 September 1980) is a retired Russian-born Freestyle wrestler of Ossetian descent. He switched to the Armenian national wrestling team in 2006. Kokaev won a gold medal at the European Wrestling Championships in 2004 representing Russia and a silver medal in 2006 representing Armenia.

References

1980 births
Living people
Armenian male sport wrestlers
Russian male sport wrestlers
European Wrestling Championships medalists
Sportspeople from Vladikavkaz